A wind farm or wind park, also called a wind power station or wind power plant, is a group of wind turbines in the same location used to produce electricity. Wind farms vary in size from a small number of turbines to several hundred wind turbines covering an extensive area. Wind farms can be either onshore or offshore.

Many of the largest operational onshore wind farms are located in China, India, and the United States. For example, the largest wind farm in the world, Gansu Wind Farm in China had a capacity of over 6,000 MW by 2012, with a goal of 20,000 MW by 2020. As of December 2020, the 1218 MW Hornsea Wind Farm in the UK is the largest offshore wind farm in the world. Individual wind turbine designs continue to increase in power, resulting in fewer turbines being needed for the same total output.

Because they require no fuel, wind farms have less impact on the environment than many other forms of power generation and are often referred to as a good source of green energy. Wind farms have, however, been criticised for their visual impact and impact on the landscape. Typically they need to be spread over more land than other power stations and need to be built in wild and rural areas, which can lead to "industrialization of the countryside", habitat loss, and a drop in tourism. Some critics claim that wind farms have adverse health effects, but most researchers consider these claims to be pseudoscience (see wind turbine syndrome). Wind farms can interfere with radar, although in most cases, according to the US Department of Energy, "siting and other mitigations have resolved conflicts and allowed wind projects to co-exist effectively with radar".

Design and location 

Location is critical to the overall  success of a wind farm. Additional conditions contributing to a successful wind farm location include: wind conditions, access to electric transmission, physical access, and local electricity prices.

The faster the average wind speed, the more electricity the wind turbine will generate, so faster winds are generally economically better for wind farm developments. The balancing factor is that strong gusts and high turbulence require stronger more expensive turbines, otherwise there is a risk of damage. The average power in the wind is not proportional to the average wind speed. For this reason, the ideal wind conditions would be strong but consistent winds with low turbulence coming from a single direction.

Mountain passes are ideal locations for wind farms under these conditions. Mountain passes channel wind, blocked by mountains, through a tunnel like pass towards areas of lower pressure and flatter land. Passes used for wind farms like the San Gorgonio Pass and Altamont Pass are known for their abundant wind resource capacity and capability for large-scale wind farms. These types of passes were the first places in the 1980s to have heavily invested large-scale wind farms after approval for wind energy development by the U.S. Bureau of Land Management. From these wind farms, developers learned a lot about turbulence and crowding effects of large-scale wind projects, which were previously unresearched, in the U.S. due to the lack of operational wind farms large enough to conduct these types of studies.

Usually sites are screened on the basis of a wind atlas, and validated with on-site wind measurements via long term or permanent meteorological-tower data using anemometers and wind vanes. Meteorological wind data alone is usually not sufficient for accurate siting of a large wind power project. Collection of site specific data for wind speed and direction is crucial to determining site potential in order to finance the project. Local winds are often monitored for a year or more, detailed wind maps are constructed, along with rigorous grid capability studies conducted, before any wind generators are installed.

The wind blows faster at higher altitudes because of the reduced influence of drag. The increase in velocity with altitude is most dramatic near the surface and is affected by topography, surface roughness, and upwind obstacles such as trees or buildings. At altitudes of thousands of feet/hundreds of metres above sea level, the power in the wind decreases proportional to the decrease in air density.
  
A major factor in wind-farm design is the spacing between the turbines, both laterally and axially (with respect to the prevailing winds). The closer the turbines are together, the more the upwind turbines block wind from their rear neighbors (wake effect). However, spacing turbines far apart increases the costs of roads and cables, and raises the amount of land needed to install a specific capacity of turbines. As a result of these factors, turbine spacing varies by site. Generally speaking, manufacturers require a minimum of 3.5 times the turbine's rotor diameter of clear space between each adjacent turbine's respective spatial envelope. 
 
Closer spacing is possible depending on the turbine model, the conditions at the site, and how the site will be operated. Airflows slow down as they approach an obstacle, known as the 'blockage effect', reducing available wind power by 2% for the turbines in front of other turbines.

Often in heavily saturated energy markets, the first step in site selection for large-scale wind projects, before wind resource data collection, is finding areas with adequate available transfer capability (ATC). ATC is the measure of the remaining capacity in a transmission system available for further integration of two interconnected areas without significant upgrades to existing transmission lines and substations. Significant  equipment upgrades have substantial costs, potentially undermining the viability of a project within a location, regardless of wind resource availability. Once a list of capable areas is constructed, the list is refined based on long term wind measurements, among other environmental or technical limiting factors such as proximity to load and land procurement.

Many independent system operators (ISOs) in the United States such as the California ISO and Midcontinent ISO use interconnection request queues to allow developers to propose a new generation for a specific given area and grid interconnection. These request queues have both deposit costs at the time of request and ongoing costs for the studies the ISO will make for up to years after the request was submitted to ascertain the viability of the interconnection due to factors such as ATC. Larger corporations who can afford to bid the most queues will most likely have market power as to which sites with the most resource and opportunity get to be developed upon. After the deadline to request a place in the queue has passed, many firms will withdraw their requests after gauging the competition in order to make back some of the deposit for each request that is determined too risky in comparison to other larger firms' requests.

Onshore 

The capacity of the world's first wind farm was 0.6 MW, produced by 20 wind turbines rated at 30 kilowatts each, installed on the shoulder of Crotched Mountain in southern New Hampshire in December 1980.

Onshore turbine installations in hilly or mountainous regions tend to be on ridges generally three kilometres or more inland from the nearest shoreline. This is done to exploit the topographic acceleration as the wind accelerates over a ridge. The additional wind speeds gained in this way can increase energy produced because more wind goes through the turbines. The exact position of each turbine matters, because a difference of 30 metre could potentially double output. This careful placement is referred to as 'micro-siting'.

Offshore 

Europe is the leader in offshore wind energy, with the first offshore wind farm (Vindeby) being installed in Denmark in 1991. As of 2010, there are 39 offshore wind farms in waters off Belgium, Denmark, Finland, Germany, Ireland, the Netherlands, Norway, Sweden and the United Kingdom, with a combined operating capacity of 2,396 MW. More than 100 GW (or 100,000 MW) of offshore projects are proposed or under development in Europe. The European Wind Energy Association has set a target of 40 GW installed by 2020 and 150 GW by 2030.

, The Walney Wind Farm in the United Kingdom is the largest offshore wind farm in the world at 659 MW, followed by the London Array (630 MW) also in the UK.

Offshore wind turbines are less obtrusive than turbines on land, as their apparent size and noise is mitigated by distance. Because water has less surface roughness than land (especially deeper water), the average wind speed is usually considerably higher over open water. Capacity factors (utilisation rates) are considerably higher than for onshore locations.

The province of Ontario in Canada is pursuing several proposed locations in the Great Lakes, including the suspended Trillium Power Wind 1 approximately 20 km from shore and over 400 MW in size. Other Canadian projects include one on the Pacific west coast.

In 2010, there were no offshore wind farms in the United States, but projects were under development in wind-rich areas of the East Coast, Great Lakes, and Pacific coast; and in late 2016 the Block Island Wind Farm was commissioned.

Installation and service / maintenance of off-shore wind farms are a specific challenge for technology and economic operation of a wind farm. , there are 20 jackup vessels for lifting components, but few can lift sizes above 5MW. Service vessels have to be operated nearly 24/7 (availability higher than 80% of time) to get sufficient amortisation from the wind turbines. Therefore, special fast service vehicles for installation (like Wind Turbine Shuttle) as well as for maintenance (including heave compensation and heave compensated working platforms to allow the service staff to enter the wind turbine also at difficult weather conditions) are required. So-called inertial and optical based Ship Stabilization and Motion Control systems (iSSMC) are used for that.

Experimental and proposed wind farms 
Experimental wind farms consisting of a single wind turbine for testing purposes have been built. One such installation is Østerild Wind Turbine Test Field.

Airborne wind farms have been envisaged. Such wind farms are a group of airborne wind energy systems located close to each other connected to the grid at the same point.

Wind farms consisting of diverse wind turbines have been proposed in order to efficiently use wider ranges of wind speeds. Such wind farms are proposed to be projected under two criteria: maximization of the energy produced by the farm and minimization of its costs.

By region

Australia 

The Australian Greens have been significant supporters of Australian wind farms, however the party's previous leader Bob Brown and former leader Richard Di Natale have now both expressed concerns about environmental aspects of wind turbines, particularly the potential danger they impose for birds.

Brazil 

In July 2022 Brazil reached 22 GW of installed wind power in about 750 wind farms  In 2021 Brazil was the 7th country in the world in terms of installed wind power (21 GW), and the 4th largest producer of wind energy in the world (72 TWh), behind only China, USA and Germany. The largest wind farm in the country is the Complexo eólico Lagoa dos Ventos in the State of Piauí, onshore with a current capacity of 1,000 MW being expanded to 1,500 MW.

Canada

China 

In just five years, China leapfrogged the rest of the world in wind energy production, going from 2,599 MW of capacity in 2006 to 62,733 MW at the end of 2011. However, the rapid growth outpaced China's infrastructure and new construction slowed significantly in 2012.

At the end of 2009, wind power in China accounted for 25.1 gigawatts (GW) of electricity generating capacity, and China has identified wind power as a key growth component of the country's economy. With its large land mass and long coastline, China has exceptional wind resources. Researchers from Harvard and Tsinghua University have found that China could meet all of their electricity demands from wind power by 2030.

By the end of 2008, at least 15 Chinese companies were commercially producing wind turbines and several dozen more were producing components. Turbine sizes of 1.5 MW to 3 MW became common. Leading wind power companies in China were Goldwind, Dongfang Electric, and Sinovel along with most major foreign wind turbine manufacturers. China also increased production of small-scale wind turbines to about 80,000 turbines (80 MW) in 2008. Through all these developments, the Chinese wind industry appeared unaffected by the financial crisis of 2007–2008, according to industry observers.

According to the Global Wind Energy Council, the development of wind energy in China, in terms of scale and rhythm, is absolutely unparalleled in the world. The National People's Congress permanent committee passed a law that requires the Chinese energy companies to purchase all the electricity produced by the renewable energy sector.

Europe 

In 2011 the European Union had a total installed wind capacity of 93,957 MW. Germany had the third-largest capacity in the world (after China and the United States), with an installed capacity of 29,060 MW at the end of 2011. Spain had 21,674 MW, and Italy and France each had between 6,000 and 7,000 MW. By January 2014, the UK installed capacity was 10,495 MW. But energy production can be different from capacity – in 2010, Spain had the highest European wind power production with 43 TWh compared to Germany's 35 TWh.

Europe's largest windfarm is the 'London Array', an off-shore wind farm in the Thames Estuary in the United Kingdom, with a current capacity of 630 MW (the world's largest off-shore wind farm). Other large wind farms in Europe include Fântânele-Cogealac Wind Farm near Constanța, Romania with 600 MW capacity, and Whitelee Wind Farm near Glasgow, Scotland which has a total capacity of 539 MW.

An important limiting factor of wind power is variable power generated by wind farms. In most locations the wind blows only part of the time, which means that there has to be back-up capacity of dispatchable generation capacity to cover periods that the wind is not blowing. To address this issue it has been proposed to create a "supergrid" to connect national grids together across western Europe, ranging from Denmark across the southern North Sea to England and the Celtic Sea to Ireland, and further south to France and Spain especially in Higueruela which was for some time the biggest wind farm in the world. The idea is that by the time a low pressure area has moved away from Denmark to the Baltic Sea the next low appears off the coast of Ireland. Therefore, while it is true that the wind is not blowing everywhere all of the time, it will always be blowing somewhere.

In July 2022, it became operative Seagreen, the world's deepest fixed-bottom wind farm. Located 26 miles off the Angus coastline, in Scotland, it has 114 turbines that generate 1.1 gigawatts (GW) of electricity.

India

India has the fifth largest installed wind power capacity in the world. As of 31 March 2014, the installed capacity of wind power was 21136.3 MW mainly spread across Tamil Nadu state (7253 MW). Wind power accounts nearly 8.5% of India's total installed power generation capacity, and it generates 1.6% of the country's power.

Japan

Jordan

The 117 MW Tafila Wind Farm in Jordan was inaugurated in December 2015, and is the first large scale wind farm project in the region.

Morocco 
Morocco has undertaken a vast wind energy program, to support the development of renewable energy and energy efficiency in the country. The Moroccan Integrated Wind Energy Project, spanning over a period of 10 years with a total investment estimated at $3.25 billion, will enable the country to bring the installed capacity, from wind energy, from 280 MW in 2010 to 2000 MW in 2020.

Pakistan

Pakistan has wind corridors in Jhimpir, Gharo and Keti Bundar in Sindh province and is currently developing wind power plants in Jhimpir and Mirpur Sakro (District Thatta). The government of Pakistan decided to develop wind power energy sources due to problems supplying energy to the southern coastal regions of Sindh and Balochistan.
The Zorlu Energy Putin Power Plant is the first wind power plant in Pakistan. The wind farm is being developed in Jhimpir, by Zorlu Energy Pakistan the local subsidiary of a Turkish company. The total cost of project is $136 million.[3] Completed in 2012, it has a total capacity of around 56MW.
Fauji Fertilizer Company Energy Limited, has built a 49.5 MW wind Energy Farm at Jhimpir. Contract of supply of mechanical design was awarded to Nordex and Descon Engineering Limited. Nordex a German wind turbine manufacturer. In the end of 2011 49.6 MW will be completed. Pakistani Govt. also has issued LOI of 100 MW Wind power plant to FFCEL. Pakistani Govt. has plans to achieve electric power up to 2500 MW by the end of 2015 from wind energy to bring down energy shortage.

Currently four wind farms are operational (Fauji Fertilizer 49.5 MW (subsidiary of Fauji Foundation), Three Gorges 49.5 MW, Zorlu Energy Pakistan 56 MW, Sapphire Wind Power Co Ltd 52.6 MW) and six are under construction phase ( Master Wind Energy Ltd 52.6 MW, Sachal Energy Development Ltd 49.5 MW, Yunus Energy Ltd 49.5 MW, Gul Energy 49.5 MW, Metro Energy 49.5 MW, Tapal Energy ) and expected to achieve COD in 2017.

In Gharo wind corridor, two wind farms (Foundation Energy 1 & II each 49.5 MW) are operational while two wind farms Tenaga Generasi Ltd 49.5 MW and HydroChina Dawood Power Pvt Ltd 49.5 are under construction and expected to achieve COD in 2017.

According to a USAID report, Pakistan has the potential of producing 150,000 megawatts of wind energy, of which only the Sindh corridor can produce 40,000 megawatts.

Philippines
The Philippines has the first windfarm in Southeast Asia. Located Northern part of the countries' biggest island Luzon, alongside the seashore of Bangui, Ilocos Norte.

Phase I of the NorthWind power project in Bangui Bay consists of 15 wind turbines, each capable of producing electricity up to a maximum capacity of 1.65 MW, for a total of 24.75 MW. Phase II was completed in August 2008, and added 5 more wind turbines with the same capacity, and brought the total capacity to 33 MW. All 20 turbines describes a graceful arc reflecting the shoreline of Bangui Bay, facing the West Philippine Sea.

Adjacent municipalities of Burgos and Pagudpud followed with 50 and 27 wind turbines with a capacity of 3 MW each for a Total of 150 MW and 81 MW respectively.

Two other wind farms were built outside of Ilocos Norte, the Pililla Wind Farm in Rizal and the Mindoro Wind Farm near Puerto Galera in Oriental Mindoro.

Sri Lanka

Sri Lanka has received funding from the Asian Development Bank amounting to $300 million to invest in renewable energies. From this funding as well as $80 million from the Sri Lankan Government and $60 million from France's Agence Française de Développement, Sri Lanka is building two 100MW wind farms from 2017 due to be completed by late 2020 in Northern Sri Lanka.

South Africa

 
As of September 2015 a number of sizable wind farms have been constructed in South Africa mostly in the Western Cape region. These include the 100 MW Sere Wind Farm and the 138 MW Gouda Wind Facility.

Most future wind farms in South Africa are earmarked for locations along the Eastern Cape coastline. Eskom has constructed one small scale prototype windfarm at Klipheuwel in the Western Cape and another demonstrator site is near Darling with phase 1 completed. The first commercial wind farm, Coega Wind Farm in Port Elisabeth, was developed by the Belgian company Electrawinds.

United States 

U.S. wind power installed capacity in September 2019 exceeded 100,125 MW and supplies 6.94% of the nation's electricity. The majority of wind farms in the United States are located in the Central Plains, with slow expansion into other regions of the country.

New installations place the U.S. on a trajectory to generate 20% of the nation's electricity by 2030 from wind energy. Growth in 2008 channeled some $17 billion into the economy, positioning wind power as one of the leading sources of new power generation in the country, along with natural gas. Wind projects completed in 2008 accounted for about 42% of the entire new power-producing capacity added in the U.S. during the year.

Texas, with 27,036 MW of capacity, has the most installed wind power capacity of any U.S. state, followed by Iowa with 8,965 MW and Oklahoma with 8,072 MW. Iowa is the leading state in terms of wind energy accounting for nearly 40% of total energy production in 2019. The Alta Wind Energy Center (1,020 MW) in California is the nation's largest wind farm in terms of capacity. Altamont Pass Wind Farm is the largest wind farm in the U.S. in terms of the number of individual turbines.

At the end of 2019, about 114,000 people were employed in the U.S. wind industry, and GE Energy was the largest domestic wind turbine manufacturer. In 2018, US wind power provided enough electricity to power approximately 25 million homes, avoiding the emissions of 200 million tons of carbon.

Criticism

Impact on environment and landscape

Human health 

There have been multiple scientific, peer-reviewed studies into wind farm noise, which have concluded that infrasound from wind farms is not a hazard to human health and there is no verifiable evidence for 'Wind Turbine Syndrome' causing Vibroacoustic disease, although some suggest further research might still be useful.

In a 2009 report about "Rural Wind Farms", a Standing Committee of the Parliament of New South Wales, Australia, recommended a minimum setback of two kilometres between wind turbines and neighboring houses (which can be waived by the affected neighbor) as a precautionary approach.

A 2014 paper suggests that the 'Wind Turbine Syndrome' is mainly caused by the nocebo effect and other psychological mechanisms. Australian science magazine Cosmos states that although the symptoms are real for those who suffer from the condition, doctors need to first eliminate known causes (such as pre-existing cancers or thyroid disease) before reaching definitive conclusions with the caveat that new technologies often bring new, previously unknown health risks.

Effect on power grid 

Utility-scale wind farms must have access to transmission lines to transport energy. The wind farm developer may be obliged to install extra equipment or control systems in the wind farm to meet the technical standards set by the operator of a transmission line.

The intermittent nature of wind power can pose complications for maintaining a stable power grid when wind farms provide a large percentage of electricity in any one region.

Ground radar interference 

Wind farms can interfere with ground radar systems used for military, weather and air traffic control. The large, rapidly moving blades of the turbines can return signals to the radar that can be mistaken as an aircraft or weather pattern.
Actual aircraft and weather patterns around wind farms can be accurately detected, as there is no fundamental physical constraint preventing that. But aging radar infrastructure is significantly challenged with the task. The US military is using wind turbines on some bases, including Barstow near the radar test facility.

Effects 
The level of interference is a function of the signal processors used within the radar, the speed of the aircraft and the relative orientation of wind turbines/aircraft with respect to the radar. An aircraft flying above the wind farm's turning blades could become impossible to detect because the blade tips can be moving at nearly aircraft velocity. Studies are currently being performed to determine the level of this interference and will be used in future site planning. Issues include masking (shadowing), clutter (noise), and signal alteration. Radar issues have stalled as much as 10,000 MW of projects in USA.

Some very long range radars are not affected by wind farms.

Mitigation 
Permanent problem solving include a non-initiation window to hide the turbines while still tracking aircraft over the wind farm, and a similar method mitigates the false returns.
England's Newcastle Airport is using a short-term mitigation; to "blank" the turbines on the radar map with a software patch. Wind turbine blades using stealth technology are being developed to mitigate radar reflection problems for aviation. As well as stealth windfarms, the future development of infill radar systems could filter out the turbine interference.

A mobile radar system, the Lockheed Martin TPS-77, can distinguish between aircraft and wind turbines, and more than 170 TPS-77 radars are in use around the world.

Radio reception interference 

There are also reports of negative effects on radio and television reception in wind farm communities. Potential solutions include predictive interference modelling as a component of site selection.

Wind turbines can often cause terrestrial television interference when the direct path between television transmitter and receiver is blocked by terrain. Interference effects become significant when the reflected signal from the turbine blades approaches the strength of the direct unreflected signal. Reflected signals from the turbine blades can cause loss of picture, pixellation and disrupted sound. There is a common misunderstanding that digital TV signals will not be affected by turbines – in practice they are.

Agriculture 
A 2010 study found that in the immediate vicinity of wind farms, the climate is cooler during the day and slightly warmer during the night than the surrounding areas due to the turbulence generated by the blades.

In another study an analysis carried out on corn and soybean crops in the central areas of the United States noted that the microclimate generated by wind turbines improves crops as it prevents the late spring and early autumn frosts, and also reduces the action of pathogenic fungi that grow on the leaves. Even at the height of summer heat, the lowering of 2.5–3 degrees above the crops due to turbulence caused by the blades can make a difference for the cultivation of corn.

See also 

 Renewable energy commercialisation
 Sea breeze
 Sustainable energy
 Wave farm

References

Further reading
 Righter, Robert W. Windfall: Wind Energy in America Today (University of Oklahoma Press; 2011) 219 pages; looks at the land-use decisions involved in setting up a wind farm.

External links

Map of best places for Wind Turbines around the world
World Wind Energy Association
Wind Power in the United States: Technology, Economic, and Policy Issues (53p), Congressional Research Service, June 2008
Database of projects throughout the World
Database of offshore wind projects in North America
Wind Project Community Organizing
World Wind Energy Association
4C Offshore's Global Wind Farm Interactive Map and Database
Development of Offshore Wind Recommended Practice for U.S. Waters National Renewable Energy Laboratory
Biggest Wind Farms in the World by Power-Technology

 
Infrastructure
Power stations
Sustainable technologies